Anton Mykolaiovych But (born July 3, 1980) is a Ukrainian-Russian former professional ice hockey winger who currently played over 300 games in the Kontinental Hockey League (KHL). He was selected by the New Jersey Devils in the 5th round (119th overall) of the 1998 NHL Entry Draft.

Career statistics

References

External links

1980 births
Living people
HC CSKA Moscow players
Lokomotiv Yaroslavl players
Metallurg Magnitogorsk players
New Jersey Devils draft picks
Severstal Cherepovets players
SKA Saint Petersburg players
HC Yugra players
Russian ice hockey left wingers
Ukrainian ice hockey left wingers